The black-crowned white-eye (Zosterops atrifrons) is a songbird species. It is closely related to the Old World babblers, and its family Zosteropidae might better be included in the Tiimalidae. Its subspecies from the Sulawesi region might warrant recognition as distinct species Z. subatrifrons. The Sangihe white-eye (Z. nehrkorni) and the Seram white-eye (Z. stalkeri) were formerly included in Z. atrifrons, as is still, on occasion, the black-fronted white-eye (Z. minor).

It is endemic to Indonesia. Its natural habitats are subtropical or tropical moist lowland forests and subtropical or tropical moist montane forests. Quite common, it is not considered a threatened species by the IUCN.

Gallery

References

Birds described in 1910
Endemic birds of Sulawesi
Zosterops
Taxonomy articles created by Polbot